Combined malonic and methylmalonic aciduria (CMAMMA), also called combined malonic and methylmalonic acidemia is an inherited metabolic disease characterized by elevated levels of malonic acid and methylmalonic acid. Some researchers have hypothesized that CMAMMA might be one of the most common forms of methylmalonic acidemia, and possibly one of the most common inborn errors of metabolism. Due to being infrequently diagnosed, it most often goes undetected.

Symptoms and signs 
The clinical phenotypes of CMAMMA are highly heterogeneous and range from asymptomatic, mild to severe symptoms. The underlying pathophysiology is not yet understood. The following symptoms are reported in the literature:
 metabolic acidosis
 coma
 hypoglycemia
 seizures
 gastrointestinal disease
 developmental delay
 speech delay
 failure to thrive
 psychiatric disease
 memory problems
 cognitive decline
 encephalopathy
 cardiomyopathy
 dysmorphic features

When the first symptoms appear in childhood, they are more likely to be intermediary metabolic disorders, whereas in adults they are usually neurological symptoms.

Causes 
CMAMMA can be divided by causation into two separate inherited disorders: one is a deficiency of the mitochondrial enzyme acyl-CoA synthetase family member 3, encoded by the ACSF3 gene (OMIM#614265); the other disorder is a malonyl-CoA decarboxylase deficiency encoded by the MLYCD gene (OMIM#248360).

ACSF3 deficiency 
CMAMMA due to ACSF3 is inherited in an autosomal recessive manner. The ACSF3 gene is located on chromosome 16 locus q24.3 and consists of 11 exons and encodes a 576-amino-acid protein. CMAMMA can be caused by homozygous or compound heterozygous variants in the ACSF3 gene. Based on minor allele frequency (MAF), a population incidence of ~ 1: 30 000 can be predicted for CMAMMA due to ACSF3.

Malonyl-CoA decarboxylase deficiency 
CMAMMA due to malonyl-CoA decarboxylase is also inherited in an autosomal recessive manner. The MLYCD gene is located on chromosome 16 locus q23.3.

Pathophysiology

ACSF3 
ACSF3 encodes an acyl-CoA synthetase, which is localized in the mitochondria and has a high specificity for malonic acid and methylmalonic acid. Thus, the synthetase catalyzes the synthesis of malonyl-CoA as well as methylmalonyl-CoA.

Malonic acid 
The conversion of malonic acid to malonyl-CoA by acyl-CoA synthetase represents the first step in the mitochondrial fatty acid synthesis (mtFASII) pathway, which plays an important role in the regulation of energy metabolism and which should not be confused with the more familiar fatty acid synthesis that occurs in the cytoplasm. The dysfunctional mtFASII pathway leads to an accumulation of malonic acid, which has a competitive inhibitory effect on complex II, and also leads to a deficiency of malonyl-CoA. These deficiencies can be continued to the end-product of the mtFASII pathway, octanoyl-ACP. The consequences of this are diminished oxidative phosphorylation and major alterations in complex lipids, such as increased levels of sphingomyelins and cardiolipins and lower levels of phosphatidylcholines, phosphatidylglycerol and ceramides. Since octanoyl-ACP is the direct precursor in lipoic acid synthesis, this results in diminished lipoylation, since lipoic acid acts as an essential cofactor for several mitochondrial multienzyme complexes, such as pyruvate dehydrogenase complex (PDHC) and α-ketoglutarate dehydrogenase complex (α-KGDHC), among others. This diminished lipoylation also leads to a reduced glycolytic flux. To likely compensate for the cell's energy demand, an upregulation of fatty acid β-oxidation and a decreased concentration of certain amino acids that feed anaplerotically into the citrate cycle, such as glutamine (via the fifth site of the citrate cycle), leucine, isoleucine, threonine (all via the sixth site of the citrate cycle) and aspartate (via the 10th site of the citrate cycle), could be detected. In summary, this reduced mitochondrial respiration and glycolytic flux results in impaired mitochondrial flexibility with a large dependence on fatty acid β-oxidation.

However, neurons, with the exception of hypothalamic neurons, are not capable of satisfying their large energy demands by degrading fatty acids. It is speculated that an upregulation of β-oxidation also occurs in brain cells due to the hypofunctional mtFASII pathway. The consequence would be an increased risk for hypoxia and oxidative stress, which may contribute to neurological symptoms in the long term.

Methylmalonic acid 

Methylmalonic acid is formed from the essential amino acids valine, methionine, threonine and isoleucine, from odd-chained fatty acids, from propionate and from cholesterol side chain, on the degradation path into the citrate cycle. In this process, the last intermediate methylmalony-CoA can be converted to methymalonic acid by a deacylase before incorporation at the succinyl-CoA site of the citrate cycle. At this point, the acyl-CoA synthease encoded by ACSF3 could convert the methylmalonic acid back to methylmalonyl-CoA and then feed it to the citrate cycle with the help of the methylmalonyl-CoA mutase and its cofactor vitamin B12. However, intracellular esterases are also capable of cleaving the methyl group of methylmalonic acid and generating the parent molecule malonic acid.

Bacterial fermentation in the gut is a quantitatively significant source of propionate, which is a precursor for methylmalonic acid. Alongside this, propionic acid is also absorbed through the diet, as it is naturally present in certain foods or is added as a preservative by the food industry, especially in baked goods and dairy products. In addition, methylmalonate is formed during catabolism of thymine.

In a study with fibroblasts, increased accumulations of triglycerides, an altered profile of fatty acid chain length and the presence of odd chain fatty acids were detected. A partial degradation due to accumulated methylmalonic acid and the use of propionyl-CoA as a starter unit for fatty acid synthesis is suggested as a possible cause, supported by the observation of a higher expression of CD36, which imports fatty acids into the cell.

In vitro, a connection between free methylmalonic acid and malonic acid to neurotoxicity could be established.

Malonyl-CoA decarboxylase deficiency 
Malonyl-CoA decarboxylase acts as a catalyst in the conversion of malonyl-CoA to acetyl-CoA and CO2. It is speculated that in MCD deficiency, the excess of mitochondrial malonyl-CoA increases methylmalonic acid levels, as a result of an inhibitory effect on methylmalonyl-CoA mutase. In the cytoplasm, malonyl-CoA acts as an inhibitor of the mitochondrial outer membrane enzyme carnitine palmitoyltransferase I (CPT1), which consequently inhibits fatty acid oxidation. The inhibitory effect of cytoplastic malonyl-CoA on CPT1 varies, so it inhibits roughly 100-fold greater in cardiac and skeletal muscles than in the liver.

Diagnosis 
Due to a wide range of clinical symptoms and largely slipping through newborn screening programs, CMAMMA is thought to be an under-recognized condition.

Newborn screening programs 
Because CMAMMA due to ACSF3 does not result in accumulation of methylmalonyl-CoA, malonyl-CoA, or propionyl-CoA, nor are abnormalities seen in the acylcarnitine profile, CMAMMA is not detected by standard blood-based newborn screening programs.

A special case is the province of Quebec, which, in addition to the blood test, also screens urine on the 21st day after birth with the Quebec Neonatal Blood and Urine Screening Program. This makes Quebec province interesting for CMAMMA research, as it represents the only patient cohort in the world without selection bias. Between 1975 and 2010, an estimated 2 695 000 newborns were thus screened, with 3 detections of CMAMMA due to ACSF3. However, based on this lower detection rate to the predicted rate by heterozygous frequencies, it is likely that not all newborns with this biochemical phenotype were detected by the screening program. A 2019 study then identified as many as 25 CMAMMA due to ACSF3 patients in the province of Quebec. All but one came to clinical attention through the Provincial Neonatal Urine Screening Program, 20 of them directly and 4 after the diagnosis of an older sibling.

Malonic acid to methylmalonic acid ratio 
The use of plasma rather than urine is recommended for determining the ratio of malonic acid to methylmalonic acid. Since even with an increase in sensitivity for malonic acid (MA), concentrations in urine samples can be so subtle that they are easily missed. In contrast, if only urinary methylmalonic acid (MAA) is used as the sole matrix, then CMAMMA due to ACSF3 may be misdiagnosed as classic methylmalonic acidemia. Also the calculation of the MA/MAA ratio in urine is not useful, because due to overlapping, healthy individuals cannot be clearly distinguished from CMAMMA affected individuals. Whereas, by calculating the MA/MMA ratio in plasma, a CMAMMA can be clearly distinguished from a classic methylmalonic acidemia. This is true for both, vitamin B12 responders and non-responders in methylmalonic acidemia.

In CMAMMA due to ACSF3, methylamlonic acid levels exceed those of malonic acid. In contrast, in CMAMMA due to malonyl-CoA deficiency, the MMA/MA ratio is less than 1.

Genetic testing 
Extended carrier screening (ECS) in the course of fertility treatment can also identify carriers of mutations in the ACSF3 gene.

Treatments

Dietary 
One approach to reduce the accumulating amount of malonic acid and methylmalonic acid is diet. Here, a diet high in carbohydrate and low in protein has been shown to be best. Changes in malonic acid and methylmalonic acid excretion can be seen as early as 24-36 h after a change in diet.

Bacteria-reducing measures 
Another quantitatively significant source of malonic acid and methylmalonic acid, in addition to dietary protein intake, is bacterial fermentation. This leads to treatment measures such as the administration of antibiotics and laxatives.

Vitamin B12 
Since some forms of methylmalonic acidemia respond to vitamin B12, treatment attempts in CMAMMA due to ACSF3 with vitamin B12 have been made, also in the form of hydroxocobalamin injections, which, however did not lead to any clinical or biochemical effects.

L-Carnitin 
One study also mentions treatment with L-carnitine in patients with CMAMMA due to ACSF3, but only retrospectively and without mentioning results.

messenger RNA 
Preclinical proof of concept studies in animal models have shown that messenger RNA (mRNA) therapy is also suitable for use in rare metabolic diseases. In this regard, the phase 1/2 study (mRNA-3704 & mRNA-3705) for the treatment of isolated methylmalonic acidemia, which has been ongoing since 2019 by the biotechnology company Moderna, is worth mentioning.

Research 
In 1984, CMAMMA (due to malonyl-CoA decarboxylase deficiency) was described for the first time in a scientific study. Further studies on this form of CMAMMA followed until 1994, when another form of CMAMMA with normal malonyl-CoA decarboxylase activity was discovered. In 2011, genetic research through exome sequencing identified the ACSF3 gene as a cause of CMAMMA with normal malonyl-CoA decarboxylase. With a study published in 2016, calculation of the MA/MAA ratio in plasma presented a new possibility for rapid, metabolic diagnosis of CMAMMA.

See also 
 Methylmalonic acidemia
 Organic acidemia

Notes 
The term combined malonic and methylmalonic aciduria with the suffix -uria (from Greek ouron, urine) has become established in the scientific literature in contrast to the other term combined malonic and methylmalonic acedemia with the suffix -emia (from Greek aima, blood). However, in the context of CMAMMA, no clear distinction is made, since malonic acid and methylmalonic acid are elevated in both blood and urine.

References

External links 
Combined malonic and methylmalonic acidemia at Orphanet


Amino acid metabolism disorders
Rare diseases
Vitamin, coenzyme, and cofactor metabolism disorders